Wet'n'Wild Gold Coast is a water park situated in Oxenford, Gold Coast, Queensland, Australia, owned and operated by Village Roadshow Theme Parks. In 2019, the park received 1,120,000 visitors making it the most visited water park in Australia and the 19th most visited water park in the world. Wet'n'Wild Gold Coast is located adjacent to Warner Bros. Movie World, a movie-related park also owned by Village Roadshow Theme Parks. The park remains open all year with all of the pools and slides heated during the winter months. It is one of several water parks operating under the Wet'n'Wild brand globally.

History
The original park, called Cade's County was the brainchild of Colin Herringe. The concept of Cade's County WaterPark was conceived after years of researching hundreds of other waterparks around the world. Many of the original pools and slides were improvements on similar popular rides found in parks such as Wet'n'Wild Orlando, White Waters Garland TX, and NaraWorld Japan. Construction began in 1982 and at time of construction was the largest WaterPark in the Southern Hemisphere. The original name Cade's County Waterpark was named after Herringe's son Cade.

Under ownership of Village Roadshow Theme Parks, the park changed its name to Wet'n'Wild Water World to match the related Sea World and Warner Bros. Movie World theme parks. In 2013, to distinguish the park from Wet'n'Wild Sydney, the park's name was changed to Wet'n'Wild Gold Coast.

Scenes set at a water park (fictionally called "Splash Planet") in The Inbetweeners 2, a 2014 British comedy film, were filmed at the park.

Attraction history

Attractions

In selected peak seasons (such as the 2012–2013 summer season) Wet'n'Wild Gold Coast offers Fast Track, a system where guests could get to the front of a ride's line in exchange for a set fee. A similar system is in operation at Warner Bros. Movie World.

Extreme H2O Zone
The Extreme H2O Zone first opened at the back of the park for during 2006 with three rides with staggered openings. It features the latest cutting-edge attractions including a funnel slide, enclosed and open tube slides and a large body slide complex.

 Kamikaze is a unique wet and dry attraction and the first of its kind in the Southern Hemisphere. The Kamikaze is two U-shaped half pipe slides which are wet through a water channel to reduce friction. Riders are seated in two-person, inwards facing tubes and are launched down a steep slope before coming back up the other side, and so continue in a boomerang-like fashion until they run out of speed and momentum. The Kamikaze opened in late September 2008. The ride is a Water fun Products Sidewinder.
 Tornado is a four-person clover-leaf funnel slide. The Tornado dips down and then goes into a turn before speeding down a steep drop into the funnel below, reaching speeds of up to 40 km/h. The Tornado was designed and built by a Canadian waterslide manufacturer, ProSlide and opened at the park as the third attraction in the Extreme H2O Zone in 2006.
 Blackhole is two enclosed tube slides twisting and turning around each other. Riders are immersed in complete darkness as they traverse down the slide reaching high speeds. The Blackhole was acquired second hand from a defunct waterpark in Brazil and opened at the park as the second attraction in the Extreme H2O Zone in 2006.

Other rides

 AquaLoop is a collection of four looping body slides featuring a trap door release with 2.5G acceleration. The AquaLoop is the first ride of its type in Australia.
 Calypso Beach is a large lazy river attraction. Riders sit in one person tubes as the gentle current pulls them along the course. Calypso Beach was installed at the park in 1997.
It features a trio of corkscrew turns throughout the enclosed slide. It replaced the Terror Canyon slides.
 Flowrider is a Wave Loch FlowRider located next to the Giant Wave Pool.
 Giant Wave Pool is a three million litre wave pool attraction with a consistent one-metre swell. The Giant Wave Pool is one of the park's first attractions and opened in 1984 along with the rest of the park. The Giant Wave Pool featured 'Dive-in Movies' every Saturday night during the summer season, where guests could view movies from a tube dinghy in the water or deck chair on the shore. However this was discontinued following the 2011-2012 summer season.
 Mammoth Falls opened in 2000 and are two six person raft slides built by Australian Waterslides and Leisure. The tower featured two different slides – one featured a series of inline drops to the finish (known as Mammoth Plunge) while the other featured several corners (known as Mammoth River). In 2005 the  Mammoth Plunge slide was moved to Sea World and changed its name to The Plunge. After the Mammoth Plunge slide was moved, the Mammoth River attraction was mirrored. Mammoth Falls now features two slides with identical  layouts. The original two slides cost AU$2.25 million to build.
 River Rapids are four high speed body slides which opened in 2007 and are located on Whitewater Mountain. Whitewater Mountain originally housed the Whitewater Flumes which slowly deteriorated since 1984 when the park opened. The River Rapids are two fully enclosed water slides and two open air flumes.
 Skycoaster is an upcharge located near the front of the park by Mammoth Falls. The ride was manufactured by Skycoaster, Inc., a wholly owned division of Ride Entertainment Group, who installed the ride.
 Super 8 Aqua Racer, as the name suggests, is an eight lane timed mat racer slide. Riders reach speeds of up to 40 km/h as they race headfirst down an 86-metre long track. With the help of sensors at the finish line, each slider receives their placing to an accuracy of 1/1000 of a second.
 Surfrider – is an Intamin designed "Half-Pipe" roller coaster. The car is in the shape of a surfboard and is launched to either side of the half-pipe using an LIM-powered mechanism. Several water features are included to simulate riding a wave. The ride opened in September 2007.
 Wet'n'Wild Junior is a new area featuring versions of many of Wet'n'Wild's slides designed for young children.
 Whirlpool Hot Springs. During the winter months the upper level of the original Whirlpool attraction has the water drained and covers removed to expose 10 x 20 person hot spas heated at 36 degrees Celsius. In the 2009/2010 summer season, it appears the attraction remained as the Whirlpool Hot Springs. It is unknown whether the original summer attraction, Whirlpool, will return.

Previous rides

 Buccaneer Bay was a pirate themed children's play area. The area is divided into two sections. One section is an Aqua Play structure featuring water sides and activities while the other is a series of shallow pools. The original Buccaneer Bay featured shallow pools, small climbing structures and water guns. It closed mid Autumn 2005. During construction a smaller, temporary children's area (named Kokomo Cove) opened instead of Whirlpool Hot Springs for the Winter season. The current Buccaneer Bay opened in September 2005.
 Mach 5 was a large water slide complex, divided up amongst five different slides. The Sidewinders are two open flume slides which twist down to the bottom around the outside of the complex. The Jetstreams are three high speed body slides. The central slide is a freefall to the splashdown area below, similar to the Summit Plummet at Disney's Blizzard Beach. The outer two are similar, but traverse down the slope in a snake-like fashion. The Mach 5 was acquired second hand from a defunct waterpark in Brazil and opened at the park the first attraction in the Extreme H2O Zone in 2006. Following unsuccessful maintenance in December 2018, Mach 5 is now closed permanently. Mach 5 has been replaced by a new slide grouping consisting of Kaboom!, Double Barrel and Super Ripper. 
 Double Screamer was originally named Rampage, the Double Screamer was the first all fibreglass slide in the world. It was closed and removed in 2005 due to safety concerns on similar rides overseas where riders suffered serious injuries. It was also removed to make way for an expanded Buccaneer Bay which now stands in its place.
 Mammoth Plunge was built in 2000, the Mammoth Plunge Slide was donated to Sea World in 2005 where it now operates. It was replaced with a mirror of the adjacent Mammoth River slide.
 Speedcoaster saw guests plummet down an enclosed snake-like drop before a steep freefall to the splashdown zone. Originally named 'Speed Slide' when the park first opened, the attraction has since been refurbished and modified. This ride was closed to make way for the addition of AquaLoop in 2010. This ride was moved to Big Splash in Canberra.
 Speed Slide was a pair of high speed body slides that existed where the Speedcoaster once stood, and where the AquaLoop now stands. The slides were also home to a stunt show which saw performers ride the slide standing up and on boards.
 Terror Canyon 1 & 2 was closed down in 2008 pending demolition, extended maintenance or re-development. In 2009, the park confirmed that the Terror Canyon location could be used for future attractions. In 2010, the rides were removed from the park map with the queue and station being used for the zip lines.
 Twister was an attraction featuring two body slides. These slides wrap around each other forming a twisted pattern from the outside. This ride was closed to make way for the addition of AquaLoop in 2010. This ride was moved to Big Splash in Canberra.
 Wet'n'Wild Buggy was a "tomcar" buggy car attraction where guests can drive over a course through the bush featuring log obstacles, tyre grids, jumps, water splashes, walls, and a tunnel. 
 Whirlpool was located at the same location of Whirlpool Hot Springs. The attraction was only open in the summer months as a gentle one person per tube ride revolving in a circular pattern. In the 2009/2010 summer season, it appears the attraction remained as the Whirlpool Hot Springs. It is unknown whether Whirlpool will return.
 WhiteWater Mountain were 4 body flume slides opened with the park in 1984, refurbished in the 1990s, and removed in 2007. It featured slides named Cascade, Bombora, Riptide and Pipeline.

Food, beverage and merchandise

There are several food outlets placed throughout the park, each one specialising in different styles of fast food:
Bombora Burger Bar
Snack Shack
Oasis Ice Cream Parlour
Go Frozen" Frozen Coke Bar
Wraps 'n' Rolls
Natural Selections
Clocktower Coffee
Calypso Bar
Dominos 2 Go (Opened as a franchise on 12 September 2009)

There are two merchandise stores placed towards the front of the park.
 Surf Store
 Quiksilver

See also

Village Roadshow Theme Parks
 WhiteWater World
 Wet'n'Wild Sydney
 Wet'n'Wild Hawaii
 Wet'n'Wild Phoenix
 Wet'n'Wild Las Vegas

References

External links 

1984 establishments in Australia
Water parks in Queensland
Tourist attractions on the Gold Coast, Queensland
Amusement parks opened in 2009